The discography of American rapper Kodak Black consists of four studio albums, seven mixtapes and thirty-five singles (including ten singles as a featured artist), and fifty music videos. His highest-charting song is "Zeze", which features Travis Scott and Offset, and debuted and peaked at number two in 2018, becoming Black's second top 10 hit on the US Billboard Hot 100. His highest-charting solo song is "Super Gremlin", which peaked at number three on the Hot 100 in 2022.

Studio albums

Compilation albums

Mixtapes

EPs

Singles

As lead artist

As featured artist

Other charted and certified songs

Other guest appearances

Music videos

Notes

References

Discographies of American artists
Hip hop discographies